Han Kook-young (or  ; born 19 April 1990) is a South Korean football player who plays for Gangwon FC.

Club statistics

1Other tournaments include Sheikh Jassem Cup and Qatar Crown Prince Cup

External links
 
 
 
 

Living people
1990 births
Association football midfielders
South Korean footballers
South Korean expatriate footballers
2014 FIFA World Cup players
2015 AFC Asian Cup players
Shonan Bellmare players
Kashiwa Reysol players
Qatar SC players
Al-Gharafa SC players
Gangwon FC players
J1 League players
J2 League players
K League 1 players
Expatriate footballers in Japan
South Korean expatriate sportspeople in Japan
Expatriate footballers in Qatar
South Korean expatriate sportspeople in Qatar
Footballers from Seoul
Qatar Stars League players
South Korea under-17 international footballers
South Korea under-23 international footballers
South Korea international footballers